Robert Owen "Bob" Klein is a retired American football tight end. He played eleven seasons in the National Football League (NFL) with the Los Angeles Rams and San Diego Chargers.

Klein played college football at the University of Southern California in Los Angeles, where he was the starting tight end for the Trojans' 1967 national championship team. Following his senior season in 1968, he was selected 21st overall in the 1969 NFL/AFL draft by the Los Angeles Rams. At USC, Klein was part of the Gamma Tau chapter of Beta Theta Pi fraternity.

Los Angeles Rams
In his first two seasons with the Rams, Klein served as the backup tight end to veteran Billy Truax. While he appeared in all 14 games in his rookie season, he had only two receptions as he was primarily a blocker in the Rams' run oriented offense. However, he did catch a touchdown pass in the 23–20 playoff loss to the Vikings in chilly Minnesota.

After the 1970 season, the Rams traded Truax to the Dallas Cowboys for wide receiver Lance Rentzel, and Klein took over the Rams' starting tight end position. An excellent blocker, Klein also expanded his repertoire so that he averaged 21 receptions per season from 1971–76.

San Diego Chargers
Following the 1976 season, Klein was traded to the San Diego Chargers. Playing in the Chargers' high powered passing attack led by hall of fame quarterback Dan Fouts, Klein caught 91 passes for 8 touchdowns from 1977–79. Klein was then replaced by future hall of fame tight end Kellen Winslow and retired after the 1979 season.

Honors

In a 1985 vote of the fans, Klein was named as the tight end on the Los Angeles Rams' 40th Anniversary Team.

Personal life

Klein has three children and married.  He is the president and CEO of Saint John's Health Center Foundation

References

USC Trojans football players
Los Angeles Rams players
San Diego Chargers players
American football tight ends
1947 births
Living people